Manuel Arellano (born 19 June 1957) is a Spanish economist specialising in econometrics and empirical microeconomics. Together with Stephen Bond, he developed the Arellano–Bond estimator, a widely used GMM estimator for panel data. This estimator is based on the earlier article by Arellano's PhD supervisor, John Denis Sargan, and Alok Bhargava (Bhargava and Sargan, 1983). RePEc lists the paper about the Arellano-Bond estimator as the most cited article in economics.

Biography
Manuel Arellano earned his undergraduate degree at Universidad de Barcelona in 1979. Later in 1982, he began graduate studies in Econometrics and Mathematical Economics at London School of Economics and completed a Ph.D. in economics in 1985.

After his graduation, he was employed as a research lecturer at University of Oxford from 1985 to 1989 and had a research fellow at Nuffield College, Oxford, from 1986 to 1989. From 1989 to 1992, he was a lecturer in economics at London School of Economics. From 1991 until now, he is a professor of Econometrics at CEMFI, Madrid.

Publications

Books
Panel Data Econometrics, Oxford University Press: Advanced Texts in Econometrics, Oxford, 2003.
Microeconometric models and Fiscal Policy, Editor, Institute for Fiscal Studies, London, 1994.

Articles
Some Tests of Specification for Panel Data: Monte Carlo Evidence and an Application of Employment Equations, Review of Economic Studies, Volume 58, Issue 2, pp. 277–297 (with S. Bond).
Panel Data Models: Some Recent Developments. Included in the book: J.J. Heckman and E. Leamer (eds.): Handbook of Econometrics, Volume 5, Chapter 53, North-Holland, 2001 (with B. Honoré).

References

Further reading
Bhargava, A, and Sargan, JD. (1983), Estimating dynamic random effects models from panel data covering short time periods. Econometrica, 51, 1635–1659.

External links
Homepage at CEMFI

Living people
1957 births
People from Elda
20th-century Spanish  economists
Alumni of the London School of Economics
Fellows of Nuffield College, Oxford
Academics of the London School of Economics
University of Barcelona alumni
Fellows of the Econometric Society
Presidents of the Econometric Society
Fellows of the American Academy of Arts and Sciences
Members of Academia Europaea
Fellows of the European Economic Association
21st-century Spanish  economists